Silent Night, Deadly Night Part 2 is a 1987 American slasher film edited, co-written with Joseph H. Earle, and directed by Lee Harry. It is the sequel to 1984's Silent Night, Deadly Night, and was followed by Silent Night, Deadly Night 3: Better Watch Out! in 1989. Its plot focuses on Ricky Caldwell, the brother of Billy Chapman, and his own trauma regarding his parents' Christmas Eve murders, which triggers his own killing spree. The film relies heavily on flashbacks, utilizing approximately 30 minutes of stock footage from the original film.

Plot 
The sequel picks up on Christmas Eve four years after the first movie, with Ricky Caldwell (born Ricky Chapman), the 18-year-old brother of the first film's killer, now being held in a mental hospital, sentenced there for life after a trial he had for a series of murders that he committed. While being interviewed by the psychiatrist Dr. Henry Bloom, Ricky tells the story of the murders his brother Billy committed throughout a series of several flashbacks using footage from the original film. These flashbacks feature new shots to make Ricky appear in more of Billy's original story.

After this, Ricky tells his own story: after Billy's death, he was adopted and given a good upbringing, but his trauma was never treated. After his adoptive father's death, Ricky loses his composure and commits a series of random murders, targeting people who are "naughty". A chance for a normal life seems to appear when he starts dating Jennifer Statson, but an unpleasant encounter with Jennifer's ex-boyfriend Chip sends Ricky over the edge. He kills Chip by electrocuting him with jumper cables that are attached to a car, while Jennifer watches in horror, and then strangles Jennifer to death with the car antenna after she screams that she hates him. A police officer witnesses this and as Ricky is about to be arrested, he grabs the officer’s revolver and shoots him in the forehead, before going on a shooting spree. He kills at least three more people throughout the neighborhood, including one man taking out his garbage. Later on, Ricky gets himself into a stand-off, where he tries and fails to commit suicide before being arrested.

Cutting back to the present day, Ricky strangles Dr. Bloom to death using audio tape and escapes from the mental hospital. He murders a Salvation Army Santa and steals his costume. Ricky plans to kill Mother Superior, which Billy failed to do four years ago. After chasing Mother Superior throughout her house, Ricky succeeds in decapitating her. Ricky cleans up the blood and stages the scene, with Mother Superior sitting in a chair, her severed head balanced on her body. As soon as this is discovered by the police officers that arrive on the scene, a screaming Ricky leaps out and prepares to attack, but is shot down out the patio door. Sister Mary wakes up, and the police officer tells her, "He's gone, Sister. It's over." Then she turns over and sees Mother Superior's severed head, before screaming in terror.

Ricky suddenly opens his eyes and smiles devilishly, indicating that he has survived his gunshot wounds. The final shot shows the arm of the murderer dressed in a Santa suit (footage from the first film) plunging a knife into the screen, before it freezes and the credits roll.

Cast

Principal

Archival footage

Production 
On the film’s DVD commentary, the filmmakers say that they were paid a dismal amount of money to make the film. Originally, they say, they were told to re-edit the first film and pass it off as either a sequel or a re-release. Director Lee Harry said that he demanded that a new film be shot, though he did not have the budget to create an entirely new story.

Harry says that they tried to find Eric Freeman to participate for the commentary track, but they were unable to locate him at the time.

Release 
The film received a release theatrically in the United States in April 1987. It grossed $154,323 at the box office.

The film was released on VHS and laserdisc in the United States by International Video Entertainment in September 1987. 
 The film was later reprinted on VHS in 1992 by Avid Home Entertainment.

The film was available on the DVD Double Gift Pack on October 7, 2003 from Anchor Bay Entertainment, along with the original Silent Night, Deadly Night, but was discontinued due to copyright problems, and is currently out of print.

On December 4, 2012, the film was again released alongside Part 1 as a two-disc "Christmas Survival Double Feature", containing the same archival bonus features as the 2003 release.

In the United Kingdom, the film was declined a certificate by the BBFC after the distributors refused to make the cuts required for an '18' certificate. The ban was lifted in 2020 when the film was released uncut with an 18 certificate.

On December 11, 2018, Shout! Factory under its Scream Factory label released the film in a two-disc set collector's edition on Blu-ray. It features a new 2K transfer of an archival theatrical print, with flashback footage of the first movie being taken from the same 4K master released by Shout! Factory in 2017. It contains new special features produced by Justin Beahm's Reverend Entertainment such as interviews with director Lee Harry, actors Eric Freeman, James Newman, Elizabeth Kaitan, Darrel Guilbeau, Kenny McCabe, and makeup effect artist Christopher Biggs. It also contains special features from the 2004 and 2012 DVD releases as well. Scream Factory also released the film in a limited edition collector set that is limited to 2,000 orders. It contains the Blu-ray set along with an 18x24 poster of the Blu-ray's artwork cover and an 8" action figure of Ricky Caldwell.

Reception 
The film was heavily criticised due to the excessive use of footage from the original film. However, the film has gained a cult following as a black comedy, due to Freeman's performance. In addition, the scene in which Ricky shoots a man who is taking out his trash after shouting the phrase "Garbage day!" became an Internet meme. On Rotten Tomatoes, the film has an approval rating of 25% rating, out of 8 reviews, and an average score of 3.7/10. The site has not given the film a critical consensus.

See also
 List of Christmas films

References

External links 
 
 

1987 films
1987 independent films
1980s slasher films
1987 thriller films
1980s Christmas horror films
American Christmas horror films
American independent films
American sequel films
American thriller films
Films about orphans
Films set in psychiatric hospitals
Films set in Utah
Films shot in Los Angeles
Films set in 1988
Internet memes
Santa Claus in film
Silent Night, Deadly Night films
American slasher films
Film and television memes
Films directed by Lee Harry
Films with screenplays by Lee Harry
1980s English-language films
1980s American films